The Men's madison competition at the 2022 UCI Track Cycling World Championships was held on 16 October 2022.

Results
The race was started at 14:30.

References

Men's madison